The G Files is the sixth and final studio album by American rapper Warren G. The album features guest performances from fellow 213 members, Snoop Dogg and Nate Dogg, as well as Cassie Davis and Blink-182 drummer Travis Barker.

The first single, titled "Ringtone", was released June 8, 2008. A second single, titled "Crush", featuring singer Ray J was released July 27, 2008. Warren G has also leaked the well-received "Mr. DJ", though later admitted that it would not be included on the album because he had forgotten where he found the sample. Warren G also released another street single, titled "Gigolos Get Lonely 2", however, it did not make the album.

Track listing

 Note: "Suicide" was featured in the 2003 video-game True Crime: Streets of LA under the name "What U Wanna Do", suggesting it was an unreleased track until The G Files.

References

External links
Ttlrecords.com
Raptalk.net
Ballerstatus.com
Allhiphop.com
Industryfinest.com

2009 albums
Warren G albums
Albums produced by Warren G